Countess Jutta von Sponheim (22 December 1091 – 1136) was the youngest of four noblewomen who were born into affluent surroundings in what is currently the Rhineland-Palatinate. She was the daughter of Count Stephen of Spanheim.

Jutta, instead of entering the convent at an early age, became an "anchoress," a symbolic "anchor" for the world to God, and thus she closed herself for life in a one-room shelter, with only a small window through which food was passed in, and refused to be taken out. This hut was next to the Benedictine monastery on Disibodenberg, where she was abbess. She tutored several female pupils from wealthy families and they lived with her in her hermitage. She taught and raised them all, but most notably the child Hildegard of Bingen.

On the Day of All Saints, 1 November 1112, Hildegard was given over as an oblate into the care of Jutta of Sponheim, who was only six years Hildegard’s elder. Jutta was also related to Marchioness Richardis of Stade, the mother of Hartwig, Archbishop of Bremen and of Richardis, who was intimate friends with Hildegard.

Jutta taught Hildegard to write; to read the collection of psalms used in the liturgy; and to chant the Opus Dei (‘work of God’), the weekly sequential recitation of the Canonical hours. She probably also taught Hildegard to play the zither-like string instrument called the psaltery.

Jutta was a severe practitioner of asceticism, including penitential self-flagellation. She wore a chain under her clothes, prayed barefoot in the extreme cold of a German winter, and refused the allowed (and even encouraged) modifications to the Benedictine diet for those who were sick.

As an adult, Hildegard would teach moderation. Hildegard succeeded Jutta upon her death in 1136. Hildegard's other well-known teacher is the monk Volmar.

Literature 
 : Reform und Reformgruppen im Erzbistum Mainz. Vom ’Libellus de Willigisi consuetudinibus’ zur ’Vita domnae Juttae inclusae’, Anhang II. In: Quellen und Abhandlungen zur mittelrheinischen Kirchengeschichte Bd. 68: Reformidee und Reformpolitik im spätsalisch-frühstaufischen Reich…, 1992, pp. 172 ff

External links 

 staff.uni-mainz.de

1091 births
1136 deaths
German countesses
Benedictine nuns
12th-century German nuns